Sky-Watcher is a commercial distribution company established in 1999 by the Synta Technology Corporation of Taiwan (Synta Taiwan) that markets telescopes and astronomical equipment, like mounts and eyepieces, aimed at the amateur astronomical market. The products are manufactured at Synta Taiwan's Suzhou Synta Optical Technology Co., Ltd. in Suzhou (Jiangsu), China. The brand is distributed in Canada and Europe and, in the late 2000s, was extended to the USA market.

Company history
In 1999, the brand "Sky-Watcher" was established to sell Synta Taiwan's optics with head offices in Richmond, British Columbia, Canada. The first Dobsonians were produced in the year 2000 , then in 2001 the first Maksutov–Cassegrains, and in 2004 their first Apochromat ED-APO refracting telescopes.

Sky-Watcher's product line-up contains telescopes from 2.4" (60 mm) up to 16" (406 mm) aperture with manual, motor-driven, or GoTo mounts. Since 2008, Sky-Watcher has manufactured Dobsonians with collapsible tubes, a product line they call Flex Tube-Dobsonians.

Products
Products include telescopes, spotting scopes, mounts, and many accessories.

Telescopes

Sky-Watcher has eleven model series of telescopes. These are listed below.

Esprit
Esprit 80ED, 100ED, 120ED and 150ED Super APO refractors have a doublet field flattener to get a flat field and minimize aberration and distortion. Their wide 48mm opener ensures a larger and clearer aperture and also extremely minimized halation. Connect the triplet and doublet field flattener with a high-precision thin thread to keep the optical axis perpendicular to the image.

Equinox
The Equinox series are relatively affordable Extra-low Dispersion (ED) apochromatic refractors in Optical Tube Assembly (OTA) between 66 mm and 120 mm (2.60" - 4.72"), suitable for astrophotography. The smaller apertures have medium focal ratios and the larger ones have long focal ratios. These telescopes have black-colored tubes.

ED Refractors Series
The pro series telescopes include two-element air-spaced OTA ED apochromatic refractors between 80 mm and 120 mm (3.15–4.72") with long focal ratios, also suitable for astrophotography, as well as OTA Maksutovs with very long focal ratios and apertures of 150 mm and 180 mm (5.91" and 7.09"). They are presented in Black Diamond tubes.

Refractors
The refractors series are multi-coated achromatic refractors between 70 and 150 mm (2.76–5.91"). They are available in alt-azimuth mounting for smaller apertures and equatorial mounting for larger ones. They have long focal ratios and are constructed with a black aluminum tube.

Reflectors
The Reflector series telescopes are reflectors with optics aluminized and overcoated with silicon dioxide, available in 76 mm to 254 mm sizes (2.99–10.00"). All but the smallest size are presented in equatorial mounting; the smallest one in Alt-azimuth. They are available in short, medium, and long focal ratios and chiefly parabolic mirrors. They are made with Black Diamond aluminum tubes. The 130 to 200 mm aperture parabolic mirror scopes are available with shorter tubes and dual-speed Crayford focusers and are optimized for astrophotography.

Table top
Tabletop telescopes have a 13" (330 mm) high equatorial mount, designed to be extremely portable. They include 130 mm (5.10") and 80 mm (3.15") refractors of short and medium focal lengths respectively, as well as a long-focal length 90 mm (3.54") Maksutov. They are presented in variable-colored tubes.

Solid-tube Dobsonians
The Solid-tube (traditional) Dobsonians are Dobsonian-mounted Newtonian reflectors available in 153 mm (6"), 203 mm (8"), 254 mm (10"), and 305 mm (12") models. They have thin 0.5 mm (0.02")-thick secondary mirror supports, tension control handles, and the 10" - 12" version is made from Pyrex glass. They have long, medium, and short focal ratios respectively, in order of increasing aperture. They have white-colored tubes.

Collapsible Dobsonians
The Collapsible Dobsonians are Dobsonian-mounted Newtonian reflectors available in 200 mm (8"), 254 mm (10"), 305 mm (12") and 406 mm (16") models. They are similar in design to the Solid-Tube Dobsonians but have black-colored tubes with the middle section of the tube replaced with struts. The struts allow the top portion of the tube to collapse down on the bottom portion, decreasing the tube length when in storage or being transported. The Collapsible Dobsonians also feature Crayford focusers instead of the traditional rack and pinion focuser that was included with the Solid-tube Dobsonians.

Short-tube Refractors
The Short-tube Refractors series are multi-coated two-element air-spaced Rich Field achromatic refractors with focal ratios that allow them to have short and compact tube lengths. They are available in Alt-azimuth versions for smaller apertures and equatorial mounts for larger ones, and are available in 70 mm to 150 mm (2.76" - 5.91") apertures. They are presented with blue tubes, and are suited for terrestrial photography as well as astrophotography in the larger versions.

Maksutov–Cassegrains
The Maksutov–Cassegrain telescopes are compact portable multi-coated Maksutov–Cassegrains. They are sold in equatorial mounts and are available in 90–180 mm (3.54–7") apertures. They have very long focal ratios and are sold in blue aluminum tubes. As with the Newtonians, newer ones can have the "Black Diamond" finish.

Auto-tracking
The auto-tracking series telescopes are motorized alt-azimuth telescopes, allowing the user to automatically track celestial objects. They are available in 70 mm and 80 mm (2.76" and 3.15") apertures for refractors with medium, long, and very long focal ratios, as reflectors with 76 mm and 114 mm (2.99" and 4.49") apertures and have long and short focal ratios respectively, as well as in 80 mm (3.15") Maksutov form with a very long focal ratio. They are sold in blue tubes with red-dot style reflector sight finders.

Spotting scopes
Sky-Watcher spotting scopes come in three different designs. Maksutov Spottings are sold as Maksutov telescopes available in 80–127 mm (3.15–5") apertures, and are sold as OTA with very long focal ratios and red-dot style reflector sight finders. They are constructed with blue tubes and include a carrying bag. ST1545 and ST2060 spotting scopes are wide-angle and available in 50 mm and 60 mm (1.97" and 2.36") sizes with 15–45x and 20–60x zoom respectively. They are sold with tripod attachment capability and a camera adapter and blue tubes. Digital spotting scopes are a multi-purpose digital camera, spotting scope, and telescope. They have a 70 mm (2.36") refractor design at 14x with zoom capability between 6x and 22x, and have many features including an optional solar filter, video capability, and a tripod adaptor.

Mounts
Alt-azimuth mount: AZ1, AZ2, AZ3, and AZ4

Equatorial mount: EQ1, EQ2, EQ3, and EQ5

SynScan GoTo mount: EQ3 SynScan, EQ5 SynScan, HEQ5, EQ6, AZ-EQ5, AZ-EQ6 and EQ8

Equatorial travel mount: Star adventurer, Star adventurer mini, Star adventurer 2i WiFi, Star adventurer GTI

Multi-Purpose mount: AllView mount, and Virtuoso mount

References

External links
 Official Sky-Watcher International website 
 Official Canadian website
 Sky-Watcher U.S.A Telescopes and Optics

Telescope manufacturers
Companies based in Suzhou
Chinese companies established in 1999
Chinese brands
Taiwanese brands